Regina Askia-Williams (born Imaobong Regina Askia Usoro) in Lagos on 16 December 1967. She is a Nigerian-born, to an American-based family nurse practitioner (FNP), healthcare and educational activist, television producer, writer, and public speaker, who found fame as an actress and model.

Career
In 1988, Askia-Williams – a former medical student who had transferred from the University of Calabar to the University of Lagos – was crowned Miss Unilag. That same year, she competed in the MBGN 1988 contest. Though she was a favorite to win, she placed second. However, she became the titleholder the following year when winner Bianca Onoh resigned. In 1990, Askia-Williams represented Nigeria at Miss Charm International held in Leningrad, Russia, and came second. She also made history by becoming the first Nigerian at Miss International in Japan, where she made an impact with the most outstanding traditional costume.

After gaining public recognition in Nigeria as a beauty pageant winner, Askia-Williams began a modelling career. As a model, Askia-Williams appeared in several Nigerian print and television commercials including Chicken George fast food, Kessingsheen Hair Care, boutique chain Collectibles, and most famously, Visine. She also worked on several runway shows. In 2007, she modelled for the 2000-N-Six face cleansing range alongside her daughter, model Stephanie Hornecker. In 2005 she hosted a fashion show at the Nigerian Embassy in New York City to raise awareness for the plight of children's social amenities in Nigeria, and in 2006, she hosted a charity fashion show at Lehman College in the Bronx, New York, which displayed the creations of top African designers and her own label Regine Fashions.

Askia-Williams's acting break came in 1993, when she played gold-digger Tokunbo Johnson in Nigerian soap Fortunes (later Mega Fortunes) on NTA Network, a role which earned her critical acclaim and roles in Nollywood movies. She has received several awards for her performances – including one for "Best Actress in Nigeria" by Afro Hollywood London in 2000 – and has produced several television shows and films.

Askia-Williams starred in several "Nollywood" films during the 1990s and early 2000s, most of which were filmed to be released directly to video, reaching a wide audience in Nigeria and elsewhere in Africa such as Tanzania and Ghana. She became one of Nigeria's biggest acting celebrities. Askia-Williams' films, nd other Nollywood films are regularly broadcast by Nigerian television networks, including ITV, StarTV, and the state broadcaster TVT. Askia-Williams was compared to Elizabeth Taylor for her fame, nd was paid around N300,000 for a starring role, on par with other top Nigerian actresses.

Askia-Williams also maintained an active interest in supporting medical outreach in Nigeria. In one interview, she described a project she participated in: 

A graduate of the University of Lagos with a degree in Biology, she recently became a registered nurse, after earning her nurse practitioner degree at Wagner College in the United States. Askia-Williams still works on promoting greater collaboration between Africa and its diaspora with her fashion shows as well as medical missions to Africa. She co-hosts an Internet broadcast discussion program, African Health Dialogues. The program covers such topics as the effectiveness of mobile medical clinics in Africa. Her written articles have also appeared online, and in the "Saturday Clinic" series in the Nigerian newspaper This Day.

Askia-Williams is married to American Rudolph 'Rudy' Williams, nephew of Ron Everette and grandson of Fess Williams; together the couple has two children –  daughter Teesa Olympia and son Rudolph Junior. Askia-Williams's other daughter, model Stephanie Hornecker, is from a previous relationship. She currently lives in America with her family, and is now a family nurse practitioner  practicing in New York City.

Askia-Williams survived the attack on the World Trade Center on 11 September 2001. She escaped from the building, where she worked at the time, only three months after relocating to New York City with her family.

In 2007, Askia-Williams was among several African women given an award by the Celebrating African Motherhood Organization (CAM) at a gala event in Washington, D.C.

She stop acting for quite some time and later did a come back in a movie title web.

Filmography
As an actress, Askia-Williams has starred in the following films:
Slave Warrior: The Beginning (video) (2007)
Veno (video) (2004)
Dangerous Babe (2003)
Man Snatcher (video) (2003)
Festival of Fire (2002)
Vuga (video) (2000) 
Vuga 2 (video) (2000)
The President's Daughter (2000)
Dirty Game (video) (1998)
Full Moon (1998)
Suicide Mission (1998)
Highway to the Grave (1997)
Juliet Must Die
Maximum Risk
Mena
Queen of the Night
Red Machete
Most Wanted

References

External links
 

1967 births
Living people
Actresses from Lagos
University of Lagos alumni
20th-century Nigerian actresses
Miss International 1990 delegates
Nigerian emigrants to the United States
Nigerian nurses
University of Calabar alumni
Nigerian beauty pageant winners
Most Beautiful Girl in Nigeria winners
Beauty pageant contestants from Lagos
African-American nurses
Advanced practice registered nurses
People from New York (state)
American nurses
American women nurses
Wagner College alumni
21st-century African-American people
21st-century African-American women
20th-century African-American people
20th-century African-American women
Nigerian film actresses
Nigerian television producers
Nigerian female models
Nigerian women writers
Nigerian motivational speakers